This is a list of people who were born in, lived in, or are closely associated with Raleigh, North Carolina.

Academia

 Carrie Lougee Broughton (1879–1957), librarian and first woman State Librarian
 John Chavis (1763–1838), African-American educator and theologian; early integrationist (Raleigh's Chavis Park is named for him)
 Anna J. Cooper (1858–1964), author, educator and scholar; fourth African-American woman to earn doctoral degree (in 1924)
 Phillip Griffiths, mathematician, known for his work in the field of geometry
 John E. Ivey, Jr., educator and founder of Southern Regional Education Board; co-creator of Peace Corps
 Daniel McFadden, economist
 Michael Munger, economist, Duke University political science professor
 Mary Jane Patterson, first African-American women to receive a Bachelor of Arts degree
 Tom Regan, philosopher and animal-rights advocate
 Vermont C. Royster (1914–1996), managing editor of Wall Street Journal, Pulitzer Prize winner, recipient of Presidential Medal of Freedom
 James E. Shepard, pharmacist, civil servant and educator, the founder of what would become North Carolina Central University
 Blake R. Van Leer, university president, dean of NC State University, inventor and civil rights advocate
 James W. York, mathematical physicist; recipient of Dannie Heineman Prize for Mathematical Physics from American Physical Society

Arts
 Juliana Royster Busbee (died 1962) and Jaques Busbee (died 1947), artists and founders of Jugtown Pottery
 Paul Friedrich, visual artist and cartoonist
 Herb Jackson, painter
 Renaldo Kuhler, scientific illustrator for the North Carolina Museum of Natural Sciences
 Rachel Nabors, gURL.com graphic designer
 Martha Nichols, choreographer and dance instructor
 Robert George Rankin IV, visual artist, abstract painter. Website: http://www.bobrankin.com
 Hunter Schafer, model and actress.
 Mel Tomlinson, ballet and modern dancer
 Lea Ved, dancer and choreographer
 Ariana DeBose, actor and dancer

Athletes

 

 Nazmi Albadawi, professional soccer player
 Loy Allen Jr., NASCAR Cup Series driver
 Chris Archer, MLB pitcher for Pittsburgh Pirates
 Hannah Aspden, youngest swimmer on Team USA to medal at either the Olympics or Paralympics in 2016
 John Baker Jr. (1935–2007), National Football League athlete and longtime Wake County sheriff
 Scott Bankhead, MLB player and pitcher for Team USA in the 1984 Olympic Games
 Darrius Barnes, Major League Soccer (MLS) player for New England Revolution
 Bates Battaglia, NHL player, played for Carolina Hurricanes 1997–2003
 Braxton Berrios, NFL wide receiver
 Rod Brind'Amour, NHL player, former Carolina Hurricanes player and current head coach
 Bucky Brooks, former NFL athlete
 Willie Burden, professional Canadian football player with Calgary Stampeders of Canadian Football League
 Everett Case (1900–1966), NC State University men's basketball coach, member of N.C. Sports Hall of Fame and College Basketball Hall of Fame
 Isadora Cerullo, Olympic rugby player for Brazil; graduated from Enloe High School
 Bill Cowher, former professional American football coach and player
 Randy Denton, NBA player
Ike Delock, Major League Baseball player 
James L. Dickey III (born 1996), basketball player for Hapoel Haifa of the Israeli Basketball Premier League
 Donald Evans, former NFL defensive end
 Ron Francis, NHL player (Carolina Hurricanes) 1998–2004, member of Hockey Hall of Fame
 David Fox, Olympic gold medalist in swimming
 Jeff Galloway, Olympic long-distance runner and author
 Justin Gatlin, Olympic sprinter
 Michael Gracz, professional poker player
 TJ Graham, NFL wide receiver with New York Jets
 Brian Gutekunst, NFL scout with Green Bay Packers
 Chesson Hadley, professional golfer
 Josh Hamilton, Major League Baseball player
 Hardy Boyz, Matt Hardy and Jeff Hardy, professional wrestlers
 Antwan Harris, NFL player for New England Patriots' Super Bowl team
 Leroy Harris, NFL player for Tennessee Titans
 Bret Hedican, NHL player, played for Carolina Hurricanes 2001–2008
 Gregory Helms, professional wrestler with World Wrestling Entertainment (WWE)
 Anne Henning, Olympic speed skater, 1972 gold and bronze medalist
 Ryan Jeffers, MLB player
 Curt Johnson, professional soccer player
 Marion Jones, disgraced Olympic track athlete
 Craig Keith, NFL player
 Chad Larose, NHL player, played for Carolina Hurricanes 2005–2013
 Roy Lassiter, professional soccer player for D.C. United and United States men's national soccer team
 Pete Maravich (1947–1988), Hall of Fame basketball player; attended high school in Raleigh
 Bruce Matthews, former NFL player for Tennessee Titans; 14-time Pro Bowl participant, Pro Football Hall of Fame inductee
 Daniel McCullers, NFL defensive lineman
 Nate McMillan, NBA player and head coach of Atlanta Hawks
 Richard Medlin, NFL player
 Ben Youssef Meite, sprinter, 3-time African champion in 100m
 Jackie Moreland (1938–1971), pro basketball player
 Kevin "PPMD" Nanney, professional Super Smash Bros. player
 Chuck Nevitt, NBA player
 Caleb Norkus, professional soccer player
 Bob Perryman, NFL player for New England Patriots and Denver Broncos
 Brandon Phillips, second baseman for Atlanta Braves, Cincinnati Reds
 Landon Powell, MLB player (Oakland Athletics)
 Shavlik Randolph, NBA player (Philadelphia 76ers)
 Greg Raymer, professional poker player
 Shawan Robinson, professional basketball player with Newcastle Eagles in the British Basketball League
 Randolph Ross, track athlete, 2020 Olympic gold medalist in the 4x400m relay
 Anthony Rush, NFL player for the Atlanta Falcons
 Paul Shuey, MLB pitcher
 Webb Simpson, PGA Tour golfer 
 Isaiah Todd, NBA G-League player
 Leigh Torrence, NFL player with Washington Redskins
 P. J. Tucker (born 1985), NBA player and 2008 Israeli Basketball Premier League MVP
 Jim Valvano (1946–1993), NC State University men's basketball coach, 1983 NCAA champion, TV commentator
 John Wall, NBA player for Houston Rockets
 Pat Watkins, MLB outfielder
 Carson Wentz, quarterback for NFL's Indianapolis Colts
 Chris Wilcox, NBA athlete
 Kristi Yamaguchi, Olympic figure skater, married to Bret Hedican
 Danny Young, NBA player
 Kay Yow (1942–2009), NC State University women's basketball coach, member of Women's Basketball Hall of Fame
Duane Underwood Jr., Professional baseball pitcher for the Pittsburgh Pirates

Business

 Louis Bacon, hedge fund manager
 Jim Baen (1943–2006), science fiction writer; founded his own publishing house, Baen Books, in 1983
 Cliff Bleszinski, lead designer of the popular Xbox 360 game Gears of War and co-founder of Boss Key Productions
 Anderson Boyd, filmmaker
 Needham B. Broughton, printer, temperance activist, and state senator
 E. Lee Hennessee, pioneer hedge fund manager
 Richard Jenrette, chairman of U.S. Securities and Exchange Commission and international philanthropist, awarded French Ordre national de la Légion d'honneur (National Order of the Legion of Honor) in 1996
 Jesse Lowe, first mayor of Omaha, Nebraska; an important real estate agent in the early city, Lowe is credited with naming the city after the Omaha Tribe
 Anand Lal Shimpi, employee of Apple Inc. and former CEO of AnandTech
 Hubertus van der Vaart, co-founder/chairman of SEAF (Small Enterprise Assistance Funds)

Entertainment

 Tyler Barnhardt, actor
 Priscilla Block, singer
 David J. Burke, screenwriter, film and television director
 Godfrey Cheshire, film writer, director and critic, former chairman of New York Film Critics Circle Awards
 Grady Cooper, director, producer, and Emmy nominated film editor
 Aubrey Dollar, actress
 Caroline Dollar, actress
 Rhoda Griffis, actress
 Michael C. Hall, actor, Dexter, Six Feet Under
 MrBeast, famous YouTuber
 Lauren Kennedy, Broadway actress and singer
 Sharon Lawrence, actress, NYPD Blue
 Beth Leavel, Tony award-winning Broadway actress
 Brandi Love, pornography actress
 Robert Duncan McNeill, actor, movie and TV director
 Daniella Monet, actress, singer and dancer
 Karin Muller, writer, filmmaker and photographer for National Geographic Society and National Public Radio
 Emily Procter, actress, CSI: Miami
 Peyton Reed, film director, Ant-Man, The Break-Up, Bring It On
Hunter Schafer, model, actress, activist, Euphoria
 Amy Sedaris, actress, writer and satirist
 Liz Vassey, actress, CSI
 Reginald VelJohnson, actor (part-time resident)
 Evan Rachel Wood, actress, Westworld
 Ira David Wood III, actor and local theatre director
 Reginald VelJohnson, actor, Family Matters
 Ariana DeBose, actor and dancer, West Side Story ,Hamilton (musical)

Military

 David W. Bagley (1883–1960), admiral in the United States Navy during World War II 
 Worth Bagley (1874–1898), United States Navy officer during the Spanish–American War
 Josephus Daniels (1862–1948), newspaper editor and publisher, United States Secretary of the Navy during World War I
 George A. Fisher Jr. (born 1942), former United States Army officer
 Vernon V. Haywood (1920–2003), former U.S. Army Air Force officer, combat fighter pilot/jet pilot, and commanding officer of Tuskegee Airmen's  302nd Fighter Squadron
 Oscar F. Peatross (1916–1993), major general in the United States Marine Corps and recipient of the Navy Cross
 Leonidas Polk (1806–1864), lieutenant-general in the Confederate States Army, killed at the Battle of Marietta, Georgia
 Millie Dunn Veasey (1918–2018), served in the Women's Auxiliary Army Corps (WAAC) and later NAACP president of Wake County chapter

Musicians

 Ryan Adams, singer-songwriter
 Clay Aiken, singer/actor
 Jeb Bishop, jazz musician
 Dan Briggs, bassist for metal band Between the Buried and Me
 Andrew Cadima, composer
 Jason Michael Carroll, country musician
 Caitlin Cary, alternative country singer
 Travis Cherry, Grammy-nominated music producer
 Cordae, hip-hop artist
 John Custer, record producer
 Steve Dobrogosz, pianist and composer
 Robbie Fulks, alt country singer
 Rajan Somasundaram, Composer, Songwriter whose album made in collaboration with Durham Symphony and Academy nominated singer Bombay Jayashri became an Amazon Top#10 International Best seller 
 Rufus Harley (1936–2006), jazz musician
 D. Kern Holoman, musicologist and conductor
 Randy Jones (born 1952), original Village People cowboy, singer/actor
 Jon Lindsay, recording artist, producer, activist
 Little Brother, rap group
 Tift Merritt, singer-songwriter
 Pee Wee Moore, jazz musician
 Mic Murphy, frontman for funk/soul group The System, moved to New York before career took off
 Tyler Marenyi, aka NGHTMRE, DJ and trap producer
 Anne-Claire Niver, singer-songwriter
 Petey Pablo, hip-hop artist
 Kate Rhudy, folk-pop and country singer-songwriter and musician
 Blake Richardson, drummer for metal band Between the Buried and Me
 Tommy Giles Rogers, Jr., lead vocalist for heavy metal band Between the Buried and Me
 Toosii, rapper and singer
 Paul Waggoner, guitarist for metal band Between the Buried and Me
 Dustie Waring, guitarist for metal band Between the Buried and Me
 Woody Weatherman, musician

Bands and music groups
 Alesana, post-hardcore band
 American Aquarium, alternative country band
 Between the Buried and Me, progressive metal band
 Bowerbirds, freak folk band
 Chatham County Line, bluegrass band
 Corrosion of Conformity, heavy metal band
 Daylight Dies, doom metal band
 Pivot, rock band
 Selah Jubilee Singers, 1930s–40s gospel quartet
 The Connells, 1980s indie rock band
 The Rosebuds, indie rock band
 Troop 41, hip-hop ensemble
 Whiskeytown, 1990s alternative country band

Politics and law

 William H. Bobbitt (1900–1992), former Chief Justice of North Carolina Supreme Court
 Alice Willson Broughton (1889–1980), former First Lady of North Carolina
 J. Melville Broughton (1888–1949), former Governor of North Carolina
 Bill Campbell, two-term mayor of Atlanta
 Ralph Campbell, three-term State auditor and first African-American to hold statewide elected office in North Carolina
 Paul Coble, 36th Mayor of Raleigh (2006–2014)
 Cate Edwards, attorney
 Stormie Forte, lawyer, politician, radio host, and first African-American woman and first openly LGBTQ woman to serve on the Raleigh City Council
 Jim Fulghum (1944–2014), physician and state legislator
 James H. Harris (1832–1891), African-American politician, former slave, co-founder of North Carolina Republican Party
 Winder R. Harris (1888–1973), Democratic United States Congressman
 John Haywood, statesman and the longest-serving North Carolina State Treasurer (40 years)
 William Henry Haywood, Jr. (1801–1852), early Democratic U.S. Senator
 Jesse Helms (1921–2008), five-term Republican U.S. Senator
 George Holding, Republican United States Congressman
 Andrew Johnson (1808–1875), 17th President of the United States
 Calvin Jones (1775–1846), Mayor of Raleigh, Adjutant General of North Carolina, and founder of Wake Forest College
 I. Beverly Lake, former Chief Justice of the North Carolina Supreme Court
 Clarence Lightner (1921–2002), mayor (1973–1975); Raleigh's first popularly elected African-American mayor and first of any major Southern city
 Greg Murphy, physician and politician
 Fred Smith, politician
 Avery C. Upchurch (1928–1994), city's longest-serving mayor of 20th Century
 George Smedes York, 33rd Mayor of Raleigh (1979–1983)
 James H. Young, African-American politician; founder and editor of Raleigh Gazette, North Carolina's first black-owned newspaper

Writers
 Edward A. Batchelor, sportswriter
 Andrew Britton (1981–2008), novelist
 Jonathan W. Daniels (1902–1981), author, editor; White House Press Secretary under presidents Franklin D. Roosevelt and Harry S. Truman
 Thomas Dixon, Jr. (1864–1946), novelist, playwright, minister and statesman
 Charles Frazier, novelist, author of Cold Mountain
 Kaye Gibbons, writer
 Katherine Indermaur, writer, poet, editor
 Mary Robinette Kowal, author
 Eleanor Frances Lattimore, children's writer and illustrator
 Dorianne Laux, poet
 Armistead Maupin, writer
 Frances Gray Patton (1906–2000), writer, first woman to enroll at University of North Carolina
 David Sedaris, author, humorist and satirist
 Lawson A. Scruggs, early African-American physician in North Carolina and noted publisher of biographies on African-American women
 Lee Smith, writer
 Jan Cox Speas, author and novelist
 Julia Montgomery Street (1898–1993), children's author and playwright

Other
 Jennifer Berry, Miss America 2006 from Oklahoma
 Bob Caudle, longtime WRAL news personality and host of Mid-Atlantic Championship Wrestling, later headed the Raleigh constituent office of U.S. Senator Jesse Helms
 John Anthony Copeland, Jr. (1834–1859), freed slave, abolitionist and political activist
 James A. Forbes, evangelist preacher, radio host
 T. Adelaide Goodno, president, North Carolina Woman's Christian Temperance Union
 Jacob Johnson, father of U.S. president Andrew Johnson
 Ray Price, motorcyclist
 Olivia Raney, church organist 
 Jacob Tobia, LGBTQ activist
 Max Yergan, African-American activist, first black college faculty member hired in state of New York

References

 
Raleigh, North Carolina
Raleigh